This is a list of coastal waterfalls, i.e. waterfalls that debouch into an ocean, grouped by continent.

Africa 
 Lobé Waterfalls (Kribi, Cameroon)
 Waterfall Bluff (South Africa)
 Secret Falls (South Africa)

Asia 

 Jeongbang Waterfall (South Korea)
 Mursala Island Waterfall (Indonesia)
 Banyutibo Waterfall (Indonesia)
Pyamaluguan Sabang Waterfall (Philippines) 
 Catandayagan Waterfall (Philippines)
 Düden Kıyı Şelalesi Waterfall (Antalya, Turkey)

Europe 
 Cascada del Ézaro waterfall, Dumbría, Galicia (Spain)
 Cascada de Maro, Maro, Málaga (Spain)

 Ketubjorg (Skagafjörður, Iceland)
 Mealt Falls (Isle of Skye, Scotland)
 Seven Sisters Waterfall (Geirangerfjord, Norway)
 The Suitor / The Friar (Geirangerfjord, Norway)
 Tresaith waterfall (Wales)
 St Audries waterfall (England)
 Mulafossur waterfall (Faroe Islands)
 Bøsdalafossur (Faroe Islands)

North America 

 Strawberry Bay Falls (Washington, USA)
 Alamere Falls (California, USA)
 McWay Falls (California, USA)
 Dunns River Falls (Jamaica)
 Wavine Cyrique (Dominica)
 Racine Falls, (Toba Inlet, British Columbia, Canada)

 Tsusiat Falls, (British Columbia, Canada)
 Playa Cocalito, Cocalito Falls (Tambor, Costa Rica)

Oceania 
 Waiulili Falls (Big Island, Hawaii, USA)
 Savulevu Yavonu Waterfall (Taveuni, Fiji)
 Curracurrong Falls (NSW, Australia)
 Waterfall Bay (Tasmania, Australia)
 King George River, (Western Australia)
New Zealand: the following waterfalls empty into fjords of the Tasman Sea: 
into Doubtful Sound - Chamberlain Falls, Helena Falls, Lady Alice Falls. 
into Milford Sound - Bowen Falls, Stirling Falls.
Samoa: Mu Pagoa Waterfall in the Palauli District on Savaii:

South America 
 Saco Bravo (Brazil)

References 

Ocean